Ahmed Sheikh Jama was a Somali academician, writer, poet and politician. From 2009 to 2014, he served as the Minister of Information of Puntland under the Abdirahman Farole administration. Jama died on 9 July 2014 in Garowe after falling ill. Farole eulogized the late leader as a legendary poet, a role model for Puntland residents, and a patriot who devoted his life to public service.

See also
Abdullahi Yusuf Ahmed

References

2014 deaths
Ethnic Somali people
Somalian poets
Somalian politicians
Somalian Muslims
Year of birth missing